The 1892 Edmonton municipal election, held February 10, 1892,  was the first after the incorporation of Edmonton as a town in the North-West Territories on January 9, 1892, and was held to elect the new town's first town council (consisting of a mayor and six aldermen) for a one-year term. It saw Matthew McCauley acclaimed as Edmonton's first mayor, and elected Colin Strang, Daniel Fraser, Edward Carey, James Goodridge, John Cameron, and Philip Daly from a field of fourteen candidates for aldermen.

Background

In 1891, the Canadian Pacific Railway's main line, which had passed well south of Edmonton, was extended northward into Strathcona, then known as South Edmonton.  Edmonton came to fear that the presence of the railway across the North Saskatchewan River would result in it being surpassed by its southern neighbour, and calls for the railway to be brought to Edmonton grew louder (this objective would be achieved in 1905).  As part of these efforts, it was judged appropriate to apply for a town charter, which was granted effective February 15, 1892, when the first town council was to be sworn into office.  The election of the first council was fixed for February 10.

Candidates

Nomination day was February 3, one week before the election, and nominations were accepted between ten am and noon.  All nominated candidates ran as independents, as political parties did not begin to make their appearance until after Edmonton was incorporated as a city in 1904.

Mayoral nominations

Matthew McCauley was nominated by George Sanderson and Colin Strang and was the only mayoral candidate nominated.  As such, he was declared elected by acclamation.

Aldermanic nominations

Although there would eventually be fourteen candidates contesting the election, on nomination day there were seventeen nominated.

Issues

As Edmonton had yet to be incorporated at the time of election, most questions facing any municipality would have to be addressed in some form by the new council.  The Edmonton Bulletin, in a February 6 editorial, listed several that it thought that candidates should be addressing:
 the level of taxation
 whether to incur liabilities for public purposes or to "live within our means"
 whether to implement some system of fire protection, or whether the substantial space between most of the town's buildings was sufficient protection itself against fire
 whether to levy taxes by a straight property tax, or whether to implement other taxes (such as dog taxes, drag taxes, boarding house taxes, poll taxes, etc.)
 how many municipal liquor licenses to issue
 what scheme of police protection to adopt
 how to establish productive industries

Additionally, in a February 13 editorial the Bulletin reminded the new council that the major purpose of incorporation had been to either construct a railroad bridge across the North Saskatchewan River or, in the event that Canadian Pacific Railway was not amenable to the idea, construct a traffic bridge to lead to the train station in South Edmonton.

Campaign

Candidate activity

The campaign was a lacklustre one; the Bulletin claimed on February 6 that only Philip Daly had even bothered to release his policies and called upon the candidates to organize a public meeting on one of the campaign's last days.  Several of the aldermanic candidates - Strang, Goodridge, Daly, and Fraser - made campaign speeches at the nomination meeting, but these were brief and promised only that the candidate would serve the town to the best of his ability if elected.  On election day itself, the Bulletin reported "light canvassing" by several of the candidates, and none at all by others.

Endorsements

The Edmonton Bulletin, the town's only paper, did not make any specific endorsements.  However, it did advise voters that
in municipal matters the only money handled comes directly sooner or later from the pockets of the individual ratepayers and therefore that a man who is liable for a large amount of taxes is more apt to be careful of expenditure than one whose taxes are not as important an item to him.

The election

Voter turnout

Eligibility to vote in the election was restricted to "men, unmarried women and widows, being British subjects over 21 years of age, who have been owners or householders within the municipality for a period of not less than three months next preceding the day of voting".  Of these, 234 cast ballots (although five of these were spoiled) out of an estimated eligible voter base of 200.  Elections officials attributed this to an "unexpected population spurt".

Election staff

The election was overseen by Returning Officer A. G. Randall, who was assisted by Deputy Returning Officer E. J. Bangs, Election Clerk J. C. F. Brown, Poll Clerk J. R. Michael, and Constable F. Shaw (who provided a mounted police patrol at the poll through election day).

Results

(bold indicates elected, italics indicate incumbent)

Mayor

Aldermen

Reaction

After McCauley's acclamation, the Bulletin commented that this event "while, no doubt, very pleasing to gentleman is not less satisfactory to the large majority of the ratepayers of the town" and praised the new mayor as a man of "energy and good judgment that, shown in lesser offices in the past, has won for him the public confidence."

References

1892
1892 elections in Canada
1892 in Alberta